Governor Easton may refer to:

John Easton (1624–1705), 15th Governor of the Colony of Rhode Island and Providence Plantations from 1690 to 1695
Nicholas Easton (1593–1675), 4th Governor of the Colony of Rhode Island and Providence Plantations from 1672 to 1674

See also
Governor Eaton (disambiguation)